Trupanea eclipta is a species of tephritid or fruit flies in the genus Trupanea of the family Tephritidae.

Distribution
United States, Mexico, Belize, Guatemala, Greater & Lesser Antilles.

References

Tephritinae
Insects described in 1934
Diptera of North America